Örenäs Castle is a stately mansion at Landskrona Municipality in  Scania, Sweden.

History
The building as it looks today was built in 1914–1918, when Swedish engineer and industrialist Carl Tranchell (1849-1919) had it constructed.
It was designed to resemble a Baroque style castle by architect Fredrik Sundbärg (1860-1913). 
During World War II, Danish and Estonian refugees were hosted here. In 1970, the building was renovated and became a public facility.
It and surrounding buildings are now a hotel (with 115 rooms ) and conference centre with a public restaurant.

See also
List of castles in Sweden

References

External links
Örenäs slott website

Landskrona Municipality
Buildings and structures in Skåne County
20th-century establishments in Skåne County